Whatman may refer to:
 Whatman plc, British laboratory equipment making-company now part of GE Healthcare
 Amherst Barrow Whatman (1909–1984), British wireless operator and radio engineer
 James Whatman (papermaker) (1702–1759) an English papermaker
 James Whatman (politician) (1813–1887), Liberal Member of Parliament for Maidstone and Western Kent
Thomas Whatman (1576-1630), MP